Massi–Tactic Women Team is a professional cycling team which competes in elite road bicycle racing events such as the UCI Women's World Tour. The team was established in 2018, before registering with the UCI for the 2019 season.

Team roster

Major wins
2022
Juegos Bolivarianos, Time Trial, Miryan Nuñez
Maarke-Kerkem, Maaike Coljé
Overall Tour of Uppsala, Nathalie Eklund
Stage 3, Nathalie Eklund

National and continental champions
2022
 National Championships Sweden WE - ITT, Nathalie Eklund
 Juegos Bolivarianos WE - ITT, Miryam Nuñez
2021
 National Championships Norway WE - Road Race, Vita Heine
2020
 National Championships Paraguay WE - ITT, Agua Marina Espínola

References

External links

UCI Women's Teams
Cycling teams established in 2018
Cycling teams based in Spain